A by-election for the seat of Lowan in the Victorian Legislative Assembly was held on Saturday 4 November 1944. The election was triggered by the notification of the death of Country Party member Hamilton Lamb on 7 December 1943. Lamb was a prisoner of war on the Burma Railway at the time of the June 1943 state election, and he had been re-elected as MLA for Lowan unopposed in his absence. He died on 7 December, but official notification of his death in Thailand was not received in Australia until 1 September 1944, nearly nine months later.

Candidates
There were three candidates for the Lowan by-election following the close of nominations on 18 October 1944. They were:
John Matthew Tripovich (Labor), an assistant station master from Nhill
Wilfred John Mibus (United Country), a farmer and grazier from Horsham
William Percy Armstrong (unendorsed Country), a farmer from Kewell North.

Results

References

1944 elections in Australia
Victorian state by-elections
1940s in Victoria (Australia)